1877 Marsden, provisional designation , is a carbonaceous Hildian asteroid from the outermost region of the asteroid belt, approximately 35 kilometers in diameter. It was discovered during the Palomar–Leiden Trojan survey in 1971, and named after British astronomer Brian Marsden.

Discovery 

Marsden was discovered on 24 March 1971, by Dutch astronomer couple Ingrid and Cornelis van Houten at Leiden, on photographic plates taken by Dutch–American astronomer Tom Gehrels at Palomar Observatory, California.

The discovery was made in a survey of faint Trojans (in spite of not having received a typical T-1 designation). The trio of Dutch and Dutch–American astronomers collaborated on the productive Palomar–Leiden survey in the 1960s, using the same procedure as for this smaller Trojan campaign: Gehrels used Palomar's Samuel Oschin telescope (also known as the 48-inch Schmidt Telescope), and shipped the photographic plates to Cornelis and Ingrid van Houten at Leiden Observatory where blinking and astrometry was carried out.

Orbit and classification 

Marsden is a member of the Hilda family. It orbits the Sun in the outermost main-belt at a distance of 3.1–4.8 AU once every 7 years and 10 months (2,861 days). Its orbit has an eccentricity of 0.21 and an inclination of 18° with respect to the ecliptic.

Physical characteristics 

This trojan asteroid has been characterized as a dark C-type and D-type asteroid.

Rotation period 

During a photometric survey of Hilda asteroids in the late 1990s, an obtained light curve for Marsden gave a rotation period of 14.4 hours with a brightness variation of 0.22 in magnitude.

Diameter and albedo 

According to the surveys carried out by the Japanese Akari satellite and NASA's Wide-field Infrared Survey Explorer with its subsequent NEOWISE mission, Marsden measures 35.27 and 35.643 kilometers in diameter and its surface has an albedo of 0.082 and 0.07, respectively. The Collaborative Asteroid Lightcurve Link assumes a standard albedo for carbonaceous asteroids of 0.057 and derives a diameter of 34.01 kilometers with an absolute magnitude of 11.07.

Naming 

This minor planet was named in honor of British astronomer Brian Marsden (1937–2010), director of the Minor Planet Center (MPC) at the Harvard–Smithsonian Center for Astrophysics, in recognition of his numerous contributions in the field of orbit calculations for comets and minor planets. The official  was published by the Minor Planet Center on 1 June 1975.

References

External links 
 Asteroid Lightcurve Database (LCDB), query form (info )
 Dictionary of Minor Planet Names, Google Books
 Asteroids and comets rotation curves, CdR – Observatoire de Genève, Raoul Behrend
 Discovery Circumstances: Numbered Minor Planets (1)-(5000) – Minor Planet Center
 
 

001877
Discoveries by Cornelis Johannes van Houten
Discoveries by Ingrid van Houten-Groeneveld
Discoveries by Tom Gehrels
Named minor planets
19710324